9000 Needles  is a 2009 documentary film about the story of a young husband and father and his family as they struggle to deal with the aftermath of a devastating stroke. It was directed by Doug Dearth.

Background
The film documents the fate of Devin Dearth, a successful businessman and champion body builder who suffered a devastating stroke caused by a bleed in his brain stem, leaving him paralyzed on his right side, unable to walk, and with difficulty speaking.
With the help of his brother Doug (film director), they then travel to Tianjin, China to try a stroke rehabilitation center that uses acupuncture and traditional Chinese Medicine.

Awards
 Dove Foundation: Five Doves family friendly review
 Temecula Valley International Film Festival 2010 Best Documentary
 Phoenix Film Festival 2010  Best Documentary and  Audience Award 
 DocuWest Film Festival 2010 Best Feature Length Documentary
 Louisville International Festival of Film 2009 1st runner-up: Audience Award
 Cleveland International Film Festival 2010 1st runner-up: Audience Award
 Mammoth Film Festival 2009 1st Runner-Up: Best Documentary

References

External links 
 
 

American documentary films
2009 documentary films
2009 films
Documentary films about health care
2000s English-language films
2000s American films